John Hooper may refer to:

John Hooper (Irish politician) (1846–1897), Irish nationalist journalist, politician and MP
John Hooper (MP for Salisbury) (1532–1572), English politician, MP for Salisbury
John Hooper (bishop) (c. 1495/1500–1555), English bishop and martyr
John Hooper (sculptor) (1926–2006), English-born Canadian sculptor
John Hooper (journalist) (born 1950), British journalist, Southern Europe editor for The Guardian
John Hooper (marine biologist), Australian marine biologist
John DeBerniere Hooper (1811–1886), American classical scholar
John Bobadil Hooper (1878–1928), Australian rules footballer 
John Hooper (Irish statistician) (1878–1930), first director of statistics for the Irish Free State
John C. Hooper (born 1945), American conservationist
John Hooper (orthodontist) (1916–2008), British orthodontist
John Lutrell Hooper, American football player known as Trell Hooper

See also 
Hooper (disambiguation)